An execution-style murder, also known as execution-style killing, a "gang style", or "kill shot" is an act of criminal murder where the perpetrator kills at close range a conscious victim who is under the complete physical control of the assailant and who has been left with no course of resistance or escape.

Its name comes from such murders being similar to the usual meaning of execution, which is the taking of life by due process of law. Execution-style killing is most often a live bullet to the brain or heart, and victims are sometimes killed while kneeling.

The terminology may derive from the process of binding the victim and killing them at close range while conscious. Some thrill killings have variously been described as execution-style murders.

United States

An example of an execution-style murder was the 1929 St. Valentine's Day massacre in Chicago, where a number of assailants posed as police officers. Color of authority, however, is not a defining component of the event, as the crimes of Stanley Williams and Dennis Rader also fall into this category. 

The weapon involved is often a handgun. Long guns, blunt instruments, bombs, and bladed weapons have also been used in killings labeled as execution-style, such as the 1993 murder of Bobby Kent in Hollywood, Florida, where Derek Kaufman delivered the fatal blow with an iron club.

See also 
 Capital punishment
 Extrajudicial killing
 Point-blank range
 Summary execution

References

Killings by type
Terrorism tactics